No. 287 Squadron was an anti-aircraft co-operation squadron of the Royal Air Force from 1941 to 1946.

History
The squadron was formed at RAF Croydon on 19 November 1941 from No. 11 Group RAFs Anti-Aircraft Co-Operation Flight. The squadron flew various aircraft, including Westland Lysanders and Bristol Blenheims. The role of No. 287 Squadron was to provide target towing and to carry out attack simulations during World War II. This was to enable continuation training for anti-aircraft units in the South of England. After spending a large period of time in Croydon, No. 287 Squadron moved to RAF North Weald in 1944, RAF Bradwell Bay in 1945 and RAF West Malling in September 1945. After Lysanders and Blenheims, No. 287 Squadron began to develop its aircraft strength, taking on board Miles Masters, Boulton Paul Defiants and Airspeed Oxfords in 1942, Miles Martinets and Spitfire VB's in 1943, Bristol Beaufighters, Spitfire IX's and Tempest V's in 1944 and Spitfire XVI's in 1945. The squadron was disbanded on 15 June 1946.

Aircraft operated

Squadron bases

References

Notes

Bibliography

External links
 287 Squadron History on RAF site
 History of No.'s 286–290 Squadrons at RAF Web

Aircraft squadrons of the Royal Air Force in World War II
287 Squadron
Military units and formations established in 1941
Military units and formations disestablished in 1946